Duffy is the nickname of:

 Duffy Ayers, English portrait painter born Elizabeth (Betty) Fitzgerald in 1915
 Duffy Cobbs (born 1964), American former football player
 Duffy Daugherty (1915–1987), American college football player and Hall of Fame coach
 Duffy Dyer (born 1945), American former Major League Baseball player
 Duffy Jackson (1953–2021), American jazz drummer
 Duffy Lewis (1888–1979), American Major League Baseball player
 Norma "Duffy" Lyon (1929–2011), American farmer and butter sculptor

See also 

 Duffy (disambiguation)
 Duffy (surname)

Lists of people by nickname